Dasineura is a genus of midges in the family Cecidomyiidae, some of which cause galls on plants such as Dasineura crataegi on hawthorn (Crataegus monogyna) and Dasineura fraxinea on ash (Fraxinus excelsior).

See also
 List of Dasineura species

References

Cecidomyiidae genera
Taxa named by Camillo Rondani
Cecidomyiinae